14th National Assembly may refer to:

 14th National Assembly of France
 14th National Assembly of Pakistan
 14th National Assembly of South Korea
 14th National Assembly of Vietnam

